Chama may refer to: 
Chama: (14)

Places
Chama, Colorado, USA, an unincorporated town
Chama, New Mexico, USA, a village
Chama, Zambia, a small town and district
Chama District, a district
Chama River (Venezuela), aka Río Chama, a river in Venezuela
Rio Chama (Rio Grande), a tributary of the Rio Grande
Chama (Maya site), an archaeological site in the Alta Verapaz, Guatemala

Other
Chama (surname)
Chama people or Ese Ejja people
Chama (bivalve), a genus of bivalve molluscs
-chama, a Japanese honorific
Chama, Archbishop of Kalocsa, 12th-century Hungarian prelate
Chama, a variant name of Kamadeva, the Hindu god of love
Chama (investment), a Swahili word meaning a welfare or investment group of people i.e. Merry-go-round fund raising group
, a Dutch tanker in service 1947-55